PC Answers was a computer magazine published in the United Kingdom by Future plc.

It was notable for its focus on the technical side of computing.  It ran several series of articles on overclocking, a "Danger! Don't Try This At Home!" section which reviewed hardware projects such as the Stone Soupercomputer and Tomohiro Kawada's dual Celeron PC. Its "Extreme Customisation" series reviewed alternate shells for Microsoft Windows such as Litestep and desktop enhancements such as Stardock's WindowBlinds.

PC Answers was reported to cease publication in September 2010. The title's last issue appeared in October 2010.

References

External links
 Official UK site

1994 establishments in the United Kingdom
2010 disestablishments in the United Kingdom
Defunct computer magazines published in the United Kingdom
Magazines established in 1994
Magazines disestablished in 2010